Polaris Partners is a venture capital firm active in the field of healthcare and biotechnology companies. The company has offices in Boston, Massachusetts, New York, NY and San Francisco, California.

History
Polaris Partners was founded in 1996 by Jon Flint, Terry McGuire, Steve Arnold.

The firm has over $5 billion in committed capital and is now making investments through its tenth fund. The current managing partners are Brian Chee, Amy Schulman, and Darren Carroll.

Polaris Partners also has two affiliate funds. Polaris Growth Fund targets investments in profitable, founder-owned technology companies and is led by managing partners Bryce Youngren and Dan Lombard. Polaris Innovation Fund focuses on the commercial and therapeutic potential of early-stage academic research and is led by managing partners Amy Schulman and Ellie McGuire.

See also
Polaris Growth Fund
Polaris Innovation Fund

References 

A Generation Gap in Venture Capital
Gupta, Udayan.  Done Deals: Venture Capitalists Tell Their Stories, 2000
Venture-Capital Firms Prepare for Next Generation of Partners
"The Thrill of Defeat". The Boston Globe, February 2001
Cocktails & Conversation with Bill Egan, Alta Communications.  Wharton School of Business, 2006.

External links
Polaris Partners

Financial services companies established in 1996
TA Associates
Venture capital firms of the United States
Life sciences industry